Guilbert is an impact crater on Venus.

Impact craters on Venus